One Nevada (ON Line) is a , 500-kilovolt,  power line that runs from Southern to Northern Nevada. 25% of the transmission line is owned by NV Energy which operates and offers the line's capacity under the terms of NV Energy's Open Access Transmission Tariff.  Great Basin Transmission South owns 75% of the line.  The line runs from the new Robinson Summit Substation in Ely, Nevada to Apex, Nevada connecting with the existing NV Energy Harry Allen Generating Station, and uses tubular guyed-V towers on a single point foundation.

History
Construction on the  line began in 2010. The line provides a way to connect renewable energy projects along the eastern edge of Nevada with the existing electrical grid.

In February 2011, the U.S. Department of Energy issued a  loan guarantee to finance the project. The project also includes the new Robinson Summit Substation, interconnection to the Harry Allen Substation, expansion of the Falcon-Gonder Substation, and new telecommunication facilities.
The line was expected to be energized in 2013.  The line was energized in January 2014.

The line may be part of the larger Southwest Intertie Project Transmission Line (SWIP) project which would extend the line north to Jerome County, Idaho.

References

Energy infrastructure in Idaho
Energy infrastructure in Nevada
Ely, Nevada
Energy infrastructure completed in 2013